Lost Cove is a ghost town in Yancey County, North Carolina. The town was first settled by Morgan Bailey shortly before the Civil War. The town is located in the Poplar Gorge above the Nolichucky River on the Tennessee-North Carolina border. Originally, the settlement was supported by logging, railroading, moonshine-making, and farming industries. Several factors contributed to the town's abandonment including rough terrain, isolation, and the end of passenger railroad stops. In 1957, the last family left Lost Cove, leaving it deserted. Fires in 2007 burned most of the structures down. Today, the town is still accessible to those willing to hike. Visitors to the area come to see the cemetery, Swin Miller's rusted Chevy still lying in a ditch, and the three houses that remain.

Railroads and logging 
Although Lost Cove is believed to have been founded around the time of the Civil War, the town did not begin to prosper until the logging industry made Lost Cove a viable stop on the railroad tracks. With its location in the mountains, Lost Cove was an ideal logging area that provided many trees from the surrounding Pisgah National Forest. Now the town was thriving with the help of logging industries and railroads, residents were able to build a school to educate their children. 
However, timber is a limited resource, and as the supply of wood began to diminish, the railroad stopped servicing the town in order to focus on other industries like coal. With a major part of the economy deteriorated, residents lobbied to build a road into Lost Cove. Legislators denied this request and the people living in the town slowly began to move away until the town was abandoned in 1957.

Moonshine 
Moonshine was an important part of Lost Cove's economy. While some families made the illicit whiskey for their own personal use, others would turn a profit by selling or trading moonshine to nearby townsfolk or men passing through on the railroad. One of the reasons that moonshiners were able to prosper in Lost Cove, was that judges trying to control the problem were unsure of which jurisdiction the town fell in. Because it fell on the Tennessee-North Carolina border and was very isolated, Lost Cove created an environment where moonshiners came to do business.

References

External links
 Aquachigger Video of a hike to Lost Cove on YouTube

Geography of Yancey County, North Carolina
Ghost towns in North Carolina